Mystical Lady is an album by organist Shirley Scott recorded in 1971 and released on the Cadet label.

Reception

The Allmusic site awarded the album 3 stars.

Track listing 
 "Hall of Jazz" (Shirley Scott, Greg Hall) – 6:17   
 "Let It Be" (John Lennon, Paul McCartney) – 7:13    
 "Love Dreams"  (George Patterson) – 5:00   
 "Proud Mary" (John Fogerty) – 6:31   
 "Mystical Lady" (Scott) – 8:32   
 "Your Song" (Elton John, Bernie Taupin) – 5:52

Personnel 
 Shirley Scott – organ
 George Patterson – alto saxophone, arranger
 Pee Wee Ellis (tracks 1 & 2), Danny Turner (tracks 3–6) – tenor saxophone
 George Freeman (tracks 1 & 2), Wally Richardson (tracks 3–6) – guitar
 Ron Carter (tracks 3–6), Richard Davis (tracks 1 & 2) – bass
 Bobby Durham (tracks 3–6), Freddie Waits (tracks 1 & 2) – drums

References 

1971 albums
Albums produced by Esmond Edwards
Cadet Records albums
Shirley Scott albums